Črmlja is a settlement in the Municipality of Trnovska Vas in northeastern Slovenia. It lies in a valley of a minor right tributary of the Pesnica River west of Trnovska Vas. The area is part of the traditional region of Styria. It is now included in the Drava Statistical Region.

A number of Roman period burial mounds have been identified in the hills southwest of the settlement in the Črmlja Woods.

References

External links
Črmlja at Geopedia

Populated places in the Municipality of Trnovska vas